Donna Schwartz-Barcott is an American nurse and anthropologist. She is a professor of nursing at University of Rhode Island. Schwartz-Barcott earned a B.S. in nursing from University of Washington. She completed an M.S. in public health and an M.A. and Ph.D. in anthropology at University of North Carolina at Chapel Hill. Her 1978 dissertation was titled National family planning programs in developing nations: a theoretical and empirical examination of the adoption process. She is married to T. P. Barcott. They have a son, Rye Barcott.

References 

Living people
Year of birth missing (living people)
American women nurses
University of Rhode Island faculty
University of Washington School of Nursing alumni
UNC Gillings School of Global Public Health alumni
American women anthropologists
20th-century American anthropologists
21st-century American anthropologists
American women academics
21st-century American women